Fusinus wallacei is a species of sea snail, a marine gastropod mollusc in the family Fasciolariidae, the spindle snails, the tulip snails and their allies.

Description
The length of the shell attains 27.1 mm.

Distribution
This marine species occurs off Indonesia off Tanimbar Islands.

References

 Hadorn R. & Fraussen K. 2006. Five new species of Fusinus (Gastropoda: Fasciolariidae) from western Pacific and Arafura Sea. Novapex 7(4): 91-102

wallacei
Gastropods described in 2006